Baby Gray was a German singer and film actress. Born on December 20, 1907, she became popular for her work in early German films.

Selected filmography
 Today Is the Day (1933)
 The Flower of Hawaii (1933)
 The Two Seals (1934) 
 Adventure on the Southern Express (1934)
 Adventure in Warsaw (1937)

References

Bibliography
 Goble, Alan. The Complete Index to Literary Sources in Film. Walter de Gruyter, 1999.

External links

1907 births
Year of death unknown
German film actresses
German women singers
Singers from Berlin